Rodrigo Cunha Pereira de Pinho (born 30 May 1991) is a German born Brazilian footballer who plays as a striker for Campeonato Brasileiro Série A club Coritiba.

Club career

Early career
Born in Henstedt-Ulzburg, Germany while his father Nando was representing Hamburger SV, Pinho joined Bangu's youth setup in 2010, aged already 19. He made his debuts as a senior for the club in the following year's Copa Rio, but suffered a serious knee injury which took him out for six months.

Cabofriense (loan)
In 2013, he was loaned to Cabofriense until the end of the year, but was recalled in September.

Madureira
On 30 April 2014 Pinho was loaned to Madureira until December. In December, he opted not to renew his contract, and signed permanently for Madura in the following month.

Braga
On 4 June 2015, after being the second top goalscorer of 2015 Campeonato Carioca, Pinho signed a four-year deal with Primeira Liga side S.C. Braga. He made his debut on the competition on 16 August, starting in a 2–1 home win against C.D. Nacional.

Marítimo
On 29 June 2017, Pinho signed a four-year contract with Marítimo.

Benfica
On 23 June 2021, Pinho joined Benfica on a five-year deal with the club. Quickly out during all the rest of the season after just 3 games and one goal, due to a severe injury (ruptured cruciate ligament).

Coritiba
On 29 December 2022, Pinha transferred from Benfica to Brazilian club Coritiba in a €2,5m transfer fee.

References

External links

1991 births
Living people
People from Henstedt-Ulzburg
Footballers from Schleswig-Holstein
Brazilian footballers
German footballers
German people of Brazilian descent
Association football forwards
Campeonato Brasileiro Série C players
Bangu Atlético Clube players
Associação Desportiva Cabofriense players
Madureira Esporte Clube players
Primeira Liga players
Liga Portugal 2 players
S.C. Braga B players
S.C. Braga players
C.D. Nacional players
C.S. Marítimo players
S.L. Benfica footballers
S.L. Benfica B players
Coritiba Foot Ball Club players
Brazilian expatriate footballers
Brazilian expatriate sportspeople in Portugal
Expatriate footballers in Portugal